Club Cerro Porteño is a professional Paraguayan football club, based in the neighbourhood of Obrero in Asunción. Founded in 1912, Cerro has won 34 Primera División titles and is one of the most popular football clubs in Paraguay. Its president is Raúl Zapag and the manager is Facundo Sava. Its main rival is Club Olimpia. They play their home games at the 45,000 seat General Pablo Rojas Stadium, also known as La Nueva Olla (The New Boiler).

History

Cerro Porteño was founded on 1 October 1912 by Susana Núñez and a group of young people looking to create a new football club. At the time of Cerro's foundation the situation in Paraguay was tense with instability in the government caused by the fervent rivalries between the two leading political parties, the Partido Colorado (Crimson Party) and the Partido Liberal (Liberal Party).

Because of the tensions, the founders of the club decided to use the colours of both parties, red (Colorados) and blue (Liberals), as the club's colours as a symbol of unity and friendship between Paraguayans. Later, white was used on the shorts to complete the colours of the Paraguayan flag.

The club owes its name to the battle fought between the forces of Buenos Aires, Argentina (The Porteños) and the Paraguayan army, in the neighbourhood of the Cerro Mbaé (Mbaé Hill) – named after that battle as the Cerro Porteño (Porteño Hill) – on 19 January 1811.  During that battle, the troops of Paraguay (at that time a Spanish colony) were abandoned by the Spanish governor but continued to be led by the Paraguayan officials, who led them to a great victory against the Porteño's troops. That battle is known as the "Battle of Cerro Porteño" and is a highlight of Paraguayan military history.

Over the years the club has won a significant number of national championships. However, to date, it has not won any international tournaments despite a few good runs in the Copa Libertadores including semi-final appearances in 1973, 1978, 1993, 1998, 1999 and 2011.

Osvaldo Ardiles joined the club as manager in May 2008, but was sacked in August of the same year after a string of poor results and was replaced by Pedro Troglio.

In 2014, Cerro Porteño president Juan José Zapag spoke in reference to the corruption in Paraguayan football that various persons had complained to him about not buying games and that if his club were to win then they would not do it by buying and doping players to become champions.

Stadium

Cerro Porteño's stadium, Estadio General Pablo Rojas, also known as "La Nueva Olla", is located in Asunción's Obrero neighborhood. It has a seating capacity of 45,000, making it the biggest in Paraguay.

International record
Copa Libertadores: 43 appearances
Semi-finals (6): 1973, 1978, 1993, 1998, 1999, 2011

Copa Sudamericana: 11 appearances
Semi-finals (2): 2009, 2016

Honours
Segunda División (1): 1912
Primera División (34): 1913, 1915, 1918, 1919, 1935, 1939, 1940, 1941, 1944, 1950, 1954, 1961, 1963, 1966, 1970, 1972, 1973, 1974, 1977, 1987, 1990, 1992, 1994, 1996, 2001, 2004, 2005, 2009 Apertura, 2012 Apertura, 2013 Clausura, 2015 Apertura, 2017 Clausura, 2020 Apertura, 2021 Clausura
Torneo República (3): 1989, 1991, 1995

Ranking

World Club Ranking

South America Club Ranking

Players

First team

Out on loan

Notable players
To appear in this section a player must have either:
 Played at least 125 games for the club.
 Set a club record or won an individual award while at the club.
 Been part of a national team squad at any time.
 Played in the first division of any other football association (outside of Paraguay).
 Played in a continental and/or intercontinental competition.

1970's
 Secundino Aifuch (1976–78), (1982)

1980's
 Justo Jacquet (1981–88), (1990), (1992-1993)

1990's
 Francisco Arce (1991–94)
 Carlos Gamarra (1991–92), (1993–95)
 Faryd Mondragon (1993)
 Julio César Yegros (1994)
 Jorge Núñez (1996–99), (2002–03), (2007–08)
 Ricardo Bitancort (1997)
 Paulo da Silva (1998)
 Delio Toledo (1998–99)
 Fabián Caballero (1998–99)
 Diego Gavilán (1998–99)

2000's
 Julio dos Santos (2001–05), (2009–2014), (2019–)
 Édgar Barreto (2002–03)
 Diego Barreto (2002–07), (2008), (2009–15)
 Dante López (2003)
 Diego Cabrera (2003)
 Glacinei Martins (2003–2005)
 Juan Cardozo (2005–06)
 Lorgio Álvarez (2005), (2007–08)
 Roberto Ovelar (2006–07)
 Marcelo Estigarribia (2006–08)(2016)
 Pablo Escobar (2006)
 Celso Ortiz (2007–10)
 Rodrigo Burgos (2007–12)
 Iván Piris (2008–11)
 Roberto Nanni (2009–13)

2010's
 Pablo Zeballos (2010)
 Fredy Bareiro (2011)
 Nelson Cuevas (2011)
 Luis Núñez (2011)
 Jonathan Fabbro (2011–13), (2014–16)
 Walter López (2012)
 Rodrigo López (2012–13)
 Fidencio Oviedo (2012–)
 Williams Martínez (2013)
 Paul Ambrosi (2013)
 Miguel Almirón (2013–15)
 José Ortigoza (2013), (2014–2017), (2020-)
 Jonathan Santana (2014–)
 Mauricio Sperduti (2014–15)
 Diego Lugano (2015)
 Fernando Amorebieta (2019–2020)
2020's
  Marcelo Martins Moreno (2022–)

Non-CONMEBOL players
 Adriano Custódio Mendes (1988)
 Jerry Laterza (1994–95)
 William Inganga (1996)
 Tobie Mimboe (1996)
 Geremi Njitap (1997)
 Cyrille Florent Bella (1998)
 Kenneth Nkweta Nju (2000–01)
 Nozomi Hiroyama (2001)
 Froylán Ledezma (2001–02)
 Diego Madrigal (2011)
 Daniel Güiza (2013–15)
 Luís Leal (2016–17)

Managerial information

Records
Most appearances for the club (in all competitions):
 Julio Dos Santos: 267
 Jorge Achucarro: 257
 Aldo Bobadilla: 265
 Estanislao Struway: 227

Most goals for the club (in all competitions):
 Virgilio Ferreira: 90
 Julio Dos Santos: 88
 Erwin Ávalos: 70
 Saturnino Arrua: 88
 José Vinsac: 58

Most appearances for the club (in league):
 Salvador Breglia: 225
 Jorge Achucarro: 215
 Julio Dos Santos: 212
 Blas Marcelo Cristaldo: 201

Most goals for the club (in league):
 Virgilio Ferreira: 67
 Erwin Ávalos: 64
 José Vinsac: 58
 Saturnino Arrua: 55

Most appearances for the club (in international cup):
 Aldo Bobadilla: 67
 Estanislao Struway: 64
 Virgilio Ferreira: 61
 Blas Marcelo Cristaldo: 57

Most goals for the club (in international cup):
 Virgilio Ferreira: 23
 Santiago Salcedo: 15
 Celino Mora: 14
 César Ramírez: 13

Women
The women's team has won the Paraguayan women's football championship four times, in 2007 and 2012 to 2014. The team then played in the Copa Libertadores Femenina.

Youth
One of the club's youth teams played at the 2006 Torneo di Viareggio.

References

External links

 
Cerro Porteño: Resultados, calendario, jugadores y partidos.
Cerro Porteño, Ranking and Statistics - FootballDatabase

 
Football clubs in Paraguay
Football clubs in Asunción
Association football clubs established in 1912
1912 establishments in Paraguay